Rafael Midkhatovich Akhmetov (born January 31, 1989) is a Russian professional ice hockey player who is currently an unrestricted free agent. He most recently played with Lada Togliatti of the then Kontinental Hockey League (KHL).

Akhmetov made his KHL debut playing with HC Neftekhimik Nizhnekamsk during the 2008–09 season.

References

External links

1989 births
Living people
HC Lada Togliatti players
Lokomotiv Yaroslavl players
People from Leninogorsk, Russia
Metallurg Novokuznetsk players
HC Neftekhimik Nizhnekamsk players
Russian ice hockey forwards
HK Poprad players
HC Sochi players
Universiade medalists in ice hockey
Universiade gold medalists for Russia
Competitors at the 2011 Winter Universiade
Sportspeople from Tatarstan
Russian expatriate sportspeople in Slovakia
Russian expatriate ice hockey people
Expatriate ice hockey players in Slovakia